Fisherwick is a civil parish in the district of Lichfield, Staffordshire, England.  The parish contains seven listed buildings that are recorded in the National Heritage List for England.  All the listed buildings are designated at Grade II, the lowest of the three grades, which is applied to "buildings of national importance and special interest".  The parish is entirely rural, without any significant settlements.  The listed buildings consist of three farmhouses and associated structures, a bridge over the River Tame, two bridges over the Birmingham and Fazeley Canal, and the gate piers on the drive of a house that has been demolished.


Buildings

References

Citations

Sources

Lichfield District
Lists of listed buildings in Staffordshire